Westphalia is a census-designated place in southern Prince George's County, Maryland, United States. The population of the CDP was 11,770 at the 2020 census.

Geography
The CDP is bordered to the west by the Capital Beltway (I-495/95) and to the south by Maryland Route 4. The CDP of Largo borders Westphalia to the north, Brock Hall is to the northeast, Marlboro Village is to the east, Queenland, Rosaryville and Melwood are to the south, Andrews Air Force Base is to the southwest, and Forestville is to the west.

Demographics

2020 census

Note: the US Census treats Hispanic/Latino as an ethnic category. This table excludes Latinos from the racial categories and assigns them to a separate category. Hispanics/Latinos can be of any race.

Planning issues
On February 6, 2007, the Prince George's County Council approved the Westphalia Sector Plan and Sectional Map Amendment.  This document established a planning concept for the Westphalia area and rezoned specified properties.   This concept is envisions a "high-density, transit- and pedestrian-oriented urban town center" surrounded by three village centers and multiple residential modules.  Buildout is proposed to include 14,000 - 15,300 new residential units, 4.5 million square feet of commercial space, and 750,000 square feet of retail space.  A 150-acre Central Park is proposed immediately north of the Town Center, approximately at the center of the Westphalia area.

Education
Prince George's County Public Schools operates public schools serving the census-designated place.

Elementary schools:
 Arrowhead Elementary School
 Barack Obama Elementary School
 Obama Elementary, in the Westphalia CDP, was the first school in the Washington, D.C., area that was named after the former president. It is adjacent to Wise High School.
The Prince George's County school board approved of the name of the school on June 25, 2009; all board members voted in favor of the renaming. The school opened on August 23, 2010, and had a cost of $25 million. The architect was Grimm + Parker Architects, and it was built for 792 students. The school's cooling system relies on over 144 geothermal pumps. The initial enrollment was 798, slightly higher than the school's stated capacity. Its opening relieved Arrowhead, Marlton, Melwood, Patuxent and Perrywood, elementary schools. The first principal was Pearl Harmon, a Liberian American; in 2014 she was reassigned to an administrative position in the PG County school system.
 Several school board members argued that naming a school after Obama would inspire area students. Many schools in PG County were named after African-Americans, and PG County voters primarily support the Democratic Party, Obama's political party. In the 2008 U.S. Presidential Election, 89% of PG County residents voted for Obama. The chairperson of the PG County Republican Party Central Committee, Mykel Harris, argued that the county should not name a school after a current president, while the chairperson of the board, Ron L. Watson, stated that the vote was not done out of political considerations.

Middle schools:
 Kettering Middle School
 James Madison Middle School

High schools:
 Dr. Henry A Wise, Jr. High School
 Largo High School

References

Census-designated places in Prince George's County, Maryland
Census-designated places in Maryland